is a Japanese international rugby union player who plays as a lock or flanker.

Club career

Kajikawa signed for the Toshiba Brave Lupus ahead of the 2010-11 Top League season, bit didn't make his debut until the following year.   By 2012 he had become a regular starter and had made more than 50 Top League appearances by the beginning of the 2016-17 season.

International

Kajikawa received his first call-up to Japan's senior squad ahead of the 2016 end-of-year rugby union internationals.

References

1987 births
Living people
Japanese rugby union players
Japan international rugby union players
Rugby union locks
Rugby union flankers
Toshiba Brave Lupus Tokyo players
Sportspeople from Fukuoka Prefecture
Fukuoka Institute of Technology alumni
Sunwolves players